Tellurian may refer to:

anything pertaining to Earth, see Earth
Tellurian (album), second album by Soen
Tellurian Inc, an American natural gas company
Tellurion, an astronomical device

See also
Telluria
Tellurium
Tellus (disambiguation)
Earthling (disambiguation)
Terran (disambiguation)